Clube Desportivo da Casa de Portugal em Macau is a football club based in Macau. The club currently competes in the Liga de Elite.

History
Founded in 2001 under the name Casa de Portugal em Macau in behalf of the defense and promotion of Portuguese language and culture to all interested parties.

Since then, the club has won two 2ª Divisão de Macau titles, besides that the team has also played in Liga de Elite, however the team was never successful in its campaigns and ended up relegated in 2016 season, but the team bounced back and won the second division again, so it was promoted in 2019 season.

Honours

League
2ª Divisão de Macau
 Champions (2): 2014, 2019

See also
 Sports in Macau

External links
Official website

Football clubs in Macau
2001 establishments in Macau